George McManus (June 18, 1846 – October 2, 1918) was a manager in Major League Baseball. He managed the St. Louis Brown Stockings of the National League for part of the 1876 season and all of the 1877 season.

His career managerial record was 34–34 in 68 games. His team finished in second place in 1876 and fourth in 1877. In the former season, he was manager for an unofficial five-game post-season series between his St. Louis team and the first place Chicago White Stockings. In the "Championship of the West", St. Louis won four to one.

External links
Baseball Reference Managerial record

1846 births
1918 deaths
St. Louis Brown Stockings managers
Irish sportspeople